A prune is a dried plum, most commonly from the European plum (Prunus domestica). Not all plum species or varieties can be dried into prunes. A prune is the firm-fleshed fruit (plum) of Prunus domestica varieties that have a high soluble solids content, and do not ferment during drying. Use of the term "prune" for fresh plums is obsolete except when applied to varieties of plum grown for drying.

Most prunes are freestone cultivars (the pit is easy to remove), whereas most plums grown for fresh consumption are clingstone (the pit is more difficult to remove).

Prunes are 64% carbohydrates, including dietary fiber, 2% protein, a rich source of vitamin K, and a moderate source of B vitamins and dietary minerals. The sorbitol content of dietary fiber likely provides the laxative effect associated with consuming prunes.

Production
More than 1,000 plum cultivars are grown for drying. The main cultivar grown in the United States is the 'Improved French' prune. Other varieties include 'Sutter', 'Tulare Giant', 'Moyer', 'Imperial', 'Italian', and greengages. Fresh prunes reach the market earlier than fresh plums and are usually smaller in size. The great majority of commercially grown prune varieties are self-fertile and do not need separate pollinator trees.

Name change
In 2001, plum growers in the United States were authorized by the Food and Drug Administration to call prunes "dried plums". Due to a perception that prunes relieve constipation (perceived as derogatory), some distributors stopped using the word "prune" on packaging labels in favor of "dried plums".

Health effects
Prunes contain dietary fiber (about 7% of weight; table) which may provide laxative effects. Their sorbitol content may also be responsible for this, a conclusion reached in a 2012 review by the European Food Safety Authority.

Nutrition
Prunes are 31% water, 64% carbohydrates, including 7% dietary fiber, 2% protein, and less than 1% fat (table). Prunes are a moderate source of vitamin K (57% of the Daily Value, DV) and a moderate source of several B vitamins and dietary minerals (4-16% DV; table).

Phytochemicals
Prunes and prune juice contain phytochemicals, including phenolic compounds (mainly as neochlorogenic acids and chlorogenic acids) and sorbitol.

Uses

Prunes are used in preparing both sweet and savory dishes.

Contrary to the name, boiled plums or prunes are not used to make sugar plums, which instead may be nuts, seeds, or spices coated with hard sugar, also called comfits.

See also

References

Dried fruit
Laxatives
Plums